John Granville Morrison, 1st Baron Margadale, TD, DL (16 December 1906 – 25 May 1996) was a British landowner and Conservative Party politician. An MP from 1942 to 1965, he notably served as Chairman of the 1922 Committee between 1955 and 1964. He was the last non-royal person to receive a hereditary barony.

Background
Morrison was the son of Hugh Morrison and Lady Mary Leveson-Gower, daughter of the Liberal statesman Granville Leveson-Gower, 2nd Earl Granville. James Morrison was his great-grandfather. The family seat is the Fonthill estate in southern Wiltshire. Morrison was educated at Eton College and Magdalene College, Cambridge and served in the Royal Wiltshire Yeomanry in the Second World War, until recalled in order to stand for election to Parliament.

Political career
Morrison was appointed High Sheriff of Wiltshire for 1938. In 1942 he was elected Member of Parliament for Salisbury, a seat he held until 1965, and served as Chairman of the 1922 Committee between 1955 and 1964. On 1 January 1965 he was raised to the peerage as Baron Margadale, of Islay in the County of Argyll, in recognition of his "political and public services". He was also Lord Lieutenant of Wiltshire between 1969 and 1981. In January 1983, he was appointed a Deputy Lieutenant for Wiltshire, together with Mary Salisbury.

He was the last commoner to be raised to the hereditary peerage until Margaret Thatcher's brief revival of the practice in 1983, and the last under a Labour government.

Other interests 

Morrison began owning and breeding horses in 1952, and established the Fonthill Stud in 19th-century stables on his estate, which has produced winners of several classic races. He also led a reorganisation of the Jockey Club.

From 1967 to 1975, he was President of the Wiltshire Historic Buildings Trust.

Family
Lord Margadale married the Honourable Margaret Smith, daughter of William Smith, 2nd Viscount Hambleden and Lady Esther Gore, on 16 October 1928. They had one daughter and three sons, the two younger of whom became Conservative politicians:

James Morrison, 2nd Baron Margadale (17 July 1930 – 6 April 2003).
Hon. Sir Charles Andrew Morrison (25 June 1932 – 9 May 2005).
Hon. Dame Mary Anne Morrison, GCVO (b. 17 May 1937), Woman of the Bedchamber to HM Queen Elizabeth II since 1960.
Rt. Hon. Sir Peter Morrison (2 June 1944 – 13 July 1995).

Lady Margadale died in 1980. Lord Margadale was succeeded in the barony by his eldest son, James.

Arms

References

External links 
 

1906 births
1996 deaths
People educated at Eton College
Alumni of Magdalene College, Cambridge
1
Chairmen of the 1922 Committee
Morrison, John Granville
Deputy Lieutenants of Wiltshire
High Sheriffs of Wiltshire
Lord-Lieutenants of Wiltshire
Morrison, John Granville
Morrison, John Granville
Morrison, John Granville
Morrison, John Granville
Morrison, John Granville
Morrison, John Granville
UK MPs who were granted peerages
Conservative Party (UK) hereditary peers
British landowners
Hereditary barons created by Elizabeth II
John
English racehorse owners and breeders